Alexandros Theofilakis (born 1877) was a Greek shooter.

Career
Theofilakis competed at the Summer Olympics in 1896, 1908, 1912, 1920 and 1924 Summer Olympics.

At the 1906 Intercalated Games, he won a silver medal at 25 m army pistol (standard model) event. In 1920 he won another silver medal, this time in the team 50m army pistol event.

References

External links

  (Digitally available at )
  (Excerpt available at )

1877 births
Year of death missing
Greek male sport shooters
Shooters at the 1896 Summer Olympics
19th-century sportsmen
Shooters at the 1906 Intercalated Games
Shooters at the 1908 Summer Olympics
Shooters at the 1912 Summer Olympics
Shooters at the 1920 Summer Olympics
Shooters at the 1924 Summer Olympics
Olympic shooters of Greece
Olympic silver medalists for Greece
Olympic medalists in shooting
Medalists at the 1906 Intercalated Games
Medalists at the 1920 Summer Olympics
Sportspeople from Sparta, Peloponnese
Date of birth missing
Place of death missing